Michael John Dudley (born 24 January 1947) is a retired British judge.

Early life
Michael Dudley was born in Bristol and educated at Magdalen College School, Brackley. He studied law at Birmingham University and graduated with an LLB degree in 1968. After graduating, he lectured in law at Wednesbury College of Commerce and Technology (now Wolverhampton University) for four years. He was called to the Bar by Lincoln's Inn in 1972.

Judicial career
Dudley's first judicial position was as a Deputy Stipendiary Magistrate in 1985. He was appointed an Assistant Recorder in 1993 and a Recorder in 1999, before being appointed a Circuit Judge in 2003. He sat at Wolverhampton Crown Court for the last seven years of his judicial career.

In his retirement speech at Wolverhampton Crown Court, Dudley voiced his concerns for the future of the legal system due to government's austerity cuts. Dudley told his audience that: 

Dudley retired as a Circuit Judge in January 2015.

References

Living people
1947 births
Alumni of the University of Birmingham
Circuit judges (England and Wales)
People educated at Magdalen College School, Brackley
Stipendiary magistrates (England and Wales)